Hangzhou (136) is a Type 956E destroyer of the People's Liberation Army Navy.

Development and design 

The project began in the late 1960s when it was becoming obvious to the Soviet Navy that naval guns still had an important role particularly in support of amphibious landings, but existing gun cruisers and destroyers were showing their age. A new design was started, employing a new 130 mm automatic gun turret.

The Chinese People's Liberation Army Navy Surface Force (PLAN) had two modified Sovremenny-class destroyers delivered in December 1999 and November 2000. In 2002, the PLAN ordered two improved versions designated 956-EM. The first vessel was launched in late 2005, while the second was launched in 2006. All four vessels were commissioned to the East Sea Fleet.

Project cost: 600 million US$ (mid-1990s price) was the price paid for Project 956A (two ships), and 1.4 billion US$ (early-2000s price) for Project 956EM (two ships).

Construction and career 
Hangzhou was laid down on 4 November 1988 and launched on 27 May 1994 by Severnaya Verf in Saint Petersburg. She was commissioned on 25 December 1999.

As of 2016, Hangzhou was reported to be undergoing refit with its original components replaced with domestic systems. In addition to replacement of electronics and sensors, armament upgrades include replacing 2x4 3M80E Moskit anti-ship missiles with 2x4 YJ-12A supersonic missiles, swapping two launchers for 48 SA-N-12 SAMs with 4 sets of 8-cell vertical launch systems totaling 32 cells for HQ-16C or Yu-8 anti-submarine missiles and adding a 24-cell FL-3000N short-range anti-air missiles.

On 29 March 2021, Taizhou, Hangzhou and Suzhou of the East Sea Fleet conducted a live firing exercise.

References 

1994 ships
Ships built at Severnaya Verf
Sovremenny-class destroyers